{{Speciesbox
| image = Diegrossschmette02seit 0017.jpg
| image_caption = Z. c. cynarae and Z. c. turatii in Seitz
| image2 = 
| image2_caption = 
| taxon = Zygaena cynarae
| authority = (Esper, 1789)
| synonyms = 
Sphinx cynarae Esper, 1789
Sphinx veronicae Borkhausen, 1789
Sphinx millefolii Borkhausen, 1789
Sphinx cinarae Esper, 1800
Zygaena uralensis Herrich-Schäffer, 1846
Zygaena genistae Herrich-Schäffer, 1846
Zygaena goberti Le Charles, 1952
Zygaena slovakica Reiss, 1968
Zygaena turatii Standfuss, 1892 
}}Zygaena cynarae is a species of moth in the Zygaenidae family. It is found from France east to Russia.

It is a large Zygaena with translucent wings with oval or rounded red spots. The anterior median spot is well developed. The basal posterior and median posterior spots are large and linked with a red line which can be missing in some specimens. The wingspan is about 30–31 mm.

Technical description and variation (Seitz) Z. cynarae Exp. (= millefolii Esp.) 5-spotted, the body entirely without hairs, with metallic green gloss; wings very sparsely scaled, the colour appearing pale. The abdomen bears a red ring which is more distinct at the sides than above. In ab. turatii Stdf. [now subspecies] the abdominal belt is entirely missing above, appearing only as a lateral spot; North Italy, Dalmatia; near Pegli, at the Riviera, I met constantly with this form, while it occurs elsewhere only sparingly among the type-form. — ab. tricingulata Burgeff [ synonym of cynarae ] has 3 abdominal belts, which, however, are usually red only above and laterally, not below. —. In genistae H.-Sch. (= dahurica H.-Sch. ), from South France, Hungary and the Tyrol, the forewing is paler and more transparent. — centaureae Fisch.-Wald. [now full species Zygaena centaureae ] has a stronger antenna and the 5th spot is prolonged towards the hind angle. — Larva greenish above, yellowish grey at the sides ; subdorsal black dots, near which there are yellow spots; head greyish green.

Biology
Adults are on wing from mid May to July.

The larvae feed on Peucedanum species, including Peucedanum cervaria. Part of the larvae overwinter multiple times. Full-grown larvae can be found from April to the beginning of June.

It is a very local and sedentary species, which requires dense colonies of its hostplant. They are sluggish and clumsy insects; the individuals occur more singly, there being apparently no decided flight-places as is the case with other Burnets.

SubspeciesZygaena cynarae cynaraeZygaena cynarae adriatica Burgeff, 1926Zygaena cynarae florianii Dujardin, 1965Zygaena cynarae franconica Holik, 1936Zygaena cynarae goberti Le Charles, 1952Zygaena cynarae jadovnika Rauch, 1977Zygaena cynarae samarensis Holik, 1939Zygaena cynarae tolmezzana Meier, 1957Zygaena cynarae turatii Standfuss, 1892Zygaena cynarae tusca Verity, 1930Zygaena cynarae vallettensis Reiss, 1958Zygaena cynarae waltharii'' Burgeff, 1926

References

Moths described in 1789
Zygaena
Moths of Europe